A strike in baseball results when a batter swings at and misses a pitch, does not swing at a pitch in the strike zone, or hits a foul ball that is not caught by a fielder (unless he already has two strikes on him).

Baseball strike may also refer to:
1972 Major League Baseball strike
1973 Major League Baseball lockout
1976 Major League Baseball lockout
1980 Major League Baseball strike
1981 Major League Baseball strike
1985 Major League Baseball strike
1990 Major League Baseball lockout
1994–95 Major League Baseball strike
2004 Nippon Professional Baseball strike